Andrea Chaplin (born 3 January 1964) is an Australian fencer. She competed in the women's individual foil events at the 1984 and 1988 Summer Olympics.

References

External links
 

1964 births
Living people
Australian female foil fencers
Olympic fencers of Australia
Fencers at the 1984 Summer Olympics
Fencers at the 1988 Summer Olympics
Sportswomen from South Australia
Sportspeople from Adelaide